Lukas Rüegg (born 9 September 1996) is a Swiss racing cyclist, who currently rides for UCI Continental team .

Major results

Road
2017
 4th International Rhodes Grand Prix
2018
 1st  Road race, National Under-23 Road Championships
 10th Overall Rás Tailteann
1st  Mountains classification
2019
 5th Tour de Vendée
 7th Overall International Tour of Rhodes
 8th International Rhodes Grand Prix
2021 
 5th Overall Tour de la Mirabelle
 7th Overall Tour de Bretagne

Track

2013
 3rd Team sprint, National Championships
2014
 3rd  Team pursuit, UEC European Junior Championships
 3rd Team sprint, National Championships
2015
 3rd Team sprint, National Championships
2016
 National Championships
3rd Elimination race
3rd Team sprint
2017
 National Championships
1st  Team pursuit
1st  Team sprint
 3rd  Team pursuit – Milton, 2017–18 UCI World Cup
2018
 UEC European Under-23 Championships
2nd  Team pursuit
3rd  Madison
 2nd Scratch, National Championships
2019
 1st  Team pursuit – Cambridge, 2019–20 UCI World Cup
 3rd  Team pursuit, European Games
 3rd  Team pursuit – Cambridge, 2018–19 UCI World Cup
 3rd Elimination race, National Championships
2020
 National Championships
2nd Scratch
3rd Points race
3rd Elimination race
 3rd  Team pursuit, UEC European Championships

References

External links

1996 births
Living people
Swiss male cyclists
Cyclists at the 2019 European Games
European Games medalists in cycling
European Games bronze medalists for Switzerland
Swiss track cyclists
21st-century Swiss people